MV Lady Mary Joy 1 is a passenger ferry owned and operated by Aleson Shipping Lines. She's the former MV Funakawa Maru acquired by Aleson Shipping.

Notable Incidents 
 February 18, 2016 when MV Lady Mary Joy 1 with 308 passengers and 38 crew members grounded off Pampat Point at Bongao island, Philippines. The ship was en route from Zamboanga City to Bongao, but due to human mistake and strong winds grounded in a rocky shallow. The ship hardly stuck and was unable to refloat by own power, requesting assistance from the local authorities. At the scene of the accident were dispatched several rescue boats, which evacuated all the passengers to the shore. According to preliminary information there are no injured people from the crew and guests on board. The authorities started investigation for the root cause of the accident.

References

External links 
 Official website
 MV Lady Mary Joy 3 Specs - Maritime Connector
 MV Lady Mary Joy 3 Specs - Shipsinfo

1994 ships
Ships built in Japan
Ferries of the Philippines
Ships of the Philippines
Maritime incidents in 2016